Mark Reefer (born 16 March 1964 in Hackney) is an English professional feather/super feather/lightweight boxer of the 1990s, who won the British Boxing Board of Control (BBBofC) Southern Area lightweight title, and Commonwealth super featherweight title, and was a challenger for the Commonwealth lightweight title against Mo Hussein, European Boxing Union (EBU) super featherweight title against Daniel Londas, and World Boxing Council (WBC) International super featherweight title against Pedro Armando Gutierrez, his professional fighting weight varied from , i.e. featherweight to , i.e. lightweight.

References

External links
 

1964 births
English male boxers
Featherweight boxers
Lightweight boxers
Living people
People from Hackney Central
Boxers from Greater London
Super-featherweight boxers